Nebbi District is a district in Northern Uganda. It is named after its main municipal, commercial and administrative centre, Nebbi, the location of the district headquarters.

Location
Nebbi District is bordered by Madi Okollo District to the north, Pakwach District to the east, Democratic Republic of the Congo (DRC) to the south and Zombo District to the west. The coordinates of the district are:02 27N, 31 15E (Latitude:2.4500; Longitude:31.2500).

Overview
The district has one county (Padyere). In 2010, Okoro County was split off Nebbi District to form Zombo District and in 2017,(Jonam) which was one of the counties that made up Nebbi was split off to form Pakwach District. There is a small airstrip near Nebbi which can be reached using commercial flights from Entebbe Airport. A railway link which has not run for many years used to link the district to the rest of the Uganda Railway system.

The first bishop of the Anglican diocese of Nebbi was Henry Luke Orombi, who is the immediate past archbishop of the Church of Uganda. The first bishop of Nebbi Catholic diocese was John Baptist Odama. He is currently the archbishop of the Roman Catholic Archdiocese of Gulu.

Population
In 1991, the national population census estimated the district population at about 185,550. The 2002 national census estimated the population of the district at approximately 226,310. The annual population growth rate of the district was calculated at 2.7%. In 2012, it was estimated that the population of Nebbi District was about 346,200. The table below illustrates the growth of the district population between 2002 and 2012. All figures are estimates.

Ethnicities
The predominant ethnicity in the district are the Alur, with the languages spoken being Alur.

Economic activities
Agriculture (crop agriculture and animal husbandry), together with fishing are the main economic activities in the district. Crops grown include:

Fishing on Lake Albert and in the Albert Nile is practiced widely for subsistence and commercial purposes. Common species of fish include Nile Perch (Lates Niloticus) and Tilapia (Oreochromis Niloticus). Local rivers in the district, such as the Nyagak and Namrwodho Rivers, also afford fishing opportunities to those far removed from Lake Albert and the Nile River.

See also
 Nebbi
 West Nile sub-region
 Northern Region, Uganda
 Districts of Uganda

References

External links
Nebbi District Official Website

 
West Nile sub-region
Districts of Uganda
Northern Region, Uganda